Francis Lake is a  lake located on Vancouver Island west of Little Nitinat River and 40 km south of Port Alberni.

References

Alberni Valley
Lakes of Vancouver Island
Barclay Land District